Out on a Limb is an autobiographical book written by American film actress and dancer Shirley MacLaine in 1983. It details MacLaine's journeys through New Age spirituality.  The book follows her from southern California to various locations including New York City, Europe, and Hawaii, culminating in a life-changing trip to the Andes Mountains in Peru. Central characters include David who is, according to MacLaine, a composite character; Gerry Stamford, a married man and fictionalized Labour member of the British House of Commons, with whom MacLaine claimed she had a love affair; and real-life close friend and politician, Bella Abzug.

The book received both acclaim and criticism for its candor in dealing with such topics as reincarnation, meditation, mediumship (trance-channeling), and even unidentified flying objects. It made Shirley MacLaine the butt of many jokes, especially by late-night television comedians. Once, when David Letterman would not let up on the New Age subject, she responded by saying, "Maybe Cher was right; maybe you are an asshole!" The claim about an affair with the MP gained attention in the UK when the book was published there.

Out on a Limb was adapted for television broadcast in 1987. The five-hour ABC miniseries starred MacLaine (as herself), John Heard as David Manning, and Charles Dance as Gerry Stamford. Anne Jackson played Bella Abzug, and Jerry Orbach played Shirley's agent.  MacLaine kept a diary during the filming of the miniseries. The notes were later turned into the book It's All In the Playing.

After the publication the former President Jimmy Carter asked MacLaine to talk about UFOs.

References

External links
Shirley MacLaine's website

Out on a Limb at Internet Movie Database. Retrieved 04 Nov 2015.
Out on a Limb at Internet Archive. Retrieved 26 Feb 2021.

1983 non-fiction books
American autobiographies
New Age books